The Salon is a 2005 comedy-drama film, directed by Mark Brown, executive produced by David Odom, and starring Vivica A. Fox, Kym Whitley, and Monica Calhoun. It was filmed in Baltimore, Maryland.

The Salon is an independent feature film that was developed, financed and produced by Howard University graduates David Odom and Mark Brown.

Plot
Jenny Smith owns a modest neighborhood beauty parlor that is hugely popular with the folks who reside on her street, but mom-and-pop businesses are failing and a corporate giant has been clamoring to set up shop on the block. Despite formidable pressure from the Department of Water and Power, Jenny refuses to accept the offer made for her shop and decides to test her luck against the DWP in the local courthouse.

Cast
Vivica A. Fox as Jenny Smith
Brooke Burns as Tami
Darrin Henson as Michael
De'Angelo Wilson as D.D.
Dondre Whitfield as Ricky
Garrett Morris as Percy
Kym Whitley as Lashaunna
Monica Calhoun as Brenda
Sheila Cutchlow as Kandy
Taral Hicks as Trina
Terrence Howard as Patrick
Tiffany Adams as Wanda

Reception
On review aggregator website Rotten Tomatoes the film has a score of 12% based on reviews from 33 critics, with an average rating of 7.5/10.

The A.V. Clubs Tasha Robinson gave it a grade "D−".

Ed Gonzalez of Slant Magazine gave it 1 star out of 4, stating that "I've seen porn with better dialogue and SNL sketches with less amateur production values".

Maitland McDonagh gave a positive review "The film's feisty cast and generally sunny outlook make for warm and reassuring comfort viewing, the equivalent of a straight-from-the-box dish of mac and cheese".

See also
Barbershop (film)
Beauty Shop

References

Bibliography

External links

African-American films
2005 comedy-drama films
American comedy-drama films
2005 comedy films
2005 drama films
2000s English-language films
2000s American films